The Galician-Portuguese term soldadeira, and the Spanish term soldadera, meant a woman of questionable morality who danced and performed gymnastic exercises during the performance of playwrights or troubadours. They have been referred to as "spiritual heirs" of the puellae gaditanae mentioned by Martial and Juvenal.

See also 

 Galician-Portuguese lyric
 María Pérez Balteira
 Flamenco

Notes

References 

 Aletti, Adelina (1980). Gli abbracci feriti: poetesse portoghesi di oggi. Milan: G. Feltrinelli. p. 5.
 Dronke, Peter (2007). Forms and Imaginings: From Antiquity to the Fifteenth Century. Edizioni di Storia e Letteratura. p. 334.
 Filios, Denise Keyes (1997). Women Out of Bounds: Soldadeiras, Panaderas, and Serranas in the Poetry of Medieval Spain. Thesis (Ph. D. in Comparative Literature). University of California, Berkeley. pp. 13, 22, 68.
 "Soldadeira". Dicionario RAG. Real Academia Galega. Retrieved 19 May 2022.

External links 

 Ofydd (17 January 2006). "A soldadeira. Facendo xustiza con María Peres "a Balteira"". Celtiberia. Retrieved 19 May 2022.

Galician literature
Portuguese literature
Dance in Portugal
Showgirls